Tomas Emil Rune Antonelius (born Tomas Gustafsson; 7 May 1973) is a Swedish former professional footballer who played as a defender. He played professionally in Sweden, Canada, England, and Denmark, before injuries cut his career short. He won eight caps for the Sweden national team between 1999 and 2002, and represented his country at UEFA Euro 2000 and the 2002 FIFA World Cup.

Club career

Early career
Antonelius had a brief stint with Canadian side Winnipeg Fury, during a year in college in North America. Whilst at AIK, he played against Arsenal in the 1999–2000 UEFA Champions League. At the time, Arsenal were playing their home European games at Wembley Stadium, giving Antonelius a run out at the famous ground.

Coventry City
In December 1999, Antonelius joined Coventry City for an undisclosed fee, signing a three-and-a-half-year contract. He made his debut against Arsenal, coming on as a late substitute for Youssef Chippo, as Coventry won 3–2.

Copenhagen
In February 2002, he joined Danish Superliga side Copenhagen. However, he suffered a serious knee injury, 1,5 years after joining the club and never played football again. He announced his retirement in September 2003, due to this failure to recover from the injury.

International career
Antonelius made his full international debut for the Sweden national team on 18 August 1999, in a friendly 0–0 draw with Austria. He made his competitive international debut for Sweden against Italy at UEFA Euro 2000, playing for 75 minutes before being replaced by Kennet Andersson in a 1–2 loss. He was also selected for the 2002 FIFA World Cup, but did not play. He won his eight and final cap on 12 October 2002 in a UEFA Euro 2004 qualifier against Hungary, playing for 67 minutes before being replaced by Mattias Jonson.

Personal life 
Antonelius began his career playing as "Tomas Gustafsson", before changing his name in 2001. The reason for this change was that "Gustafsson" is a very common name in Sweden, and he chose "Antonelius" as it was the married name of his older sister.

Career statistics

International

Honours
AIK
Allsvenskan: 1998
Svenska Cupen: 1996–97, 1998–99
Copenhagen
Danish Superliga: 2002–03

References

1973 births
Living people
2002 FIFA World Cup players
IF Brommapojkarna players
AIK Fotboll players
Allsvenskan players
Coventry City F.C. players
Danish Superliga players
Expatriate men's footballers in Denmark
Expatriate footballers in England
F.C. Copenhagen players
Association football defenders
Premier League players
Sweden international footballers
Swedish expatriate footballers
Swedish expatriate sportspeople in Denmark
Swedish expatriate sportspeople in the United Kingdom
Swedish footballers
UEFA Euro 2000 players
Winnipeg Fury players
Footballers from Stockholm